The 2016 Men's Water Polo Olympic Qualification Tournament was held in Trieste, Italy, from 3 to 10 April 2016, at the Polo Natatorio "Bruno Bianchi". The top four teams advanced to the Olympics.

Participants
There were 12 places originally allocated to continental associations in the tournament not already directly qualified to the Olympics – 9 from Europe, 1 from the Americas, 1 from Asia, and 1 from Africa.

Draw
The draw took place on 23 January 2016 in Belgrade, after the final of the 2016 European Championship.

Preliminary round
All times are local (UTC+2).

Group A

Group B

Knockout stage
All times are local (UTC+2).

Bracket

5th place bracket

Quarterfinals
The winners qualify for the 2016 Olympics.

5–8th place semifinals

Semifinals

Seventh place game

Fifth place game

Third place game

Final

Final ranking

See also
2016 Women's Water Polo Olympic Games Qualification Tournament

References

External links
Official website

Qualification Tournament, men
2016
Water Polo
Men's Water Polo
Men's Water Polo
Olympic